Valérie Grenier (born October 30, 1996) is a Canadian World Cup alpine ski racer.

From St. Isidore, Ontario, between Ottawa and Montreal, Grenier has competed at five World Championships and two Winter Olympics. At the Junior World Championships in 2016, she won the gold medal in downhill and took silver  In January 2022, she was named to Canada's 2022 Olympic team. 

Grenier attained her first World Cup podium in 2023, a victory on January 7 at a giant slalom in Kranjska Gora, posting the best result in both runs. It was the first World Cup GS win by a Canadian in 49 years, since Kathy Kreiner won in early 1974 at Pfronten, West Germany.

World Cup results

Season standings

Race podiums
 1 win (GS)
 1 podium (GS); 9 top tens  (7 GS, 2 SG)

World Championship results

Olympic results

References

External links

Valérie Grenier at Alpine Canada

1996 births
Canadian female alpine skiers
Living people
Skiers from Ottawa
Alpine skiers at the 2018 Winter Olympics
Alpine skiers at the 2022 Winter Olympics
Olympic alpine skiers of Canada